Botão is a former civil parish in the municipality of Coimbra, Portugal. The population in 2011 was 1,588, in an area of 16.52 km2. On 28 January 2013 it merged with Souselas to form Souselas e Botão.

References 

Former parishes of Coimbra